Charles Elwood Mendenhall (August 1, 1872 – August 18, 1935) was an American physicist and professor at the University of Wisconsin–Madison.

Early life
Charles Elwood Mendenhall was born on August 1, 1872, in Columbus, Ohio. He was the son of Susan Allen (née Marple) and Thomas Corwin Mendenhall. At the age of six to nine, he lived in Japan while his father taught at the University of Tokyo. There he became friends with John Morse, son of Edward S. Morse.

He received a Bachelor of Arts in 1894 from Rose Polytechnic in Terra Haute, Indiana. Starting in 1895, he studied under Henry Rowland at Johns Hopkins University and received a PhD in 1898. Under Rowland, he worked with Charles Greeley Abbot, head of the Smithsonian Astrophysical Observatory, and fellow student Frederick A. Saunders, a fellow PhD candidate, on a black-body radiation problem for his thesis.

Career
After graduation from Rose Polytechnic in 1894, Mendenhall worked with George Putnam to make a transcontinental survey of the acceleration of gravity for the U.S. National Geodetic Survey and taught physics for a year at the University of Pennsylvania. From 1898 to 1901, he taught at Williams College. In 1901, he succeeded fellow Hopkins graduate Robert W. Wood as assistant professor at the University of Wisconsin–Madison. He became a full professor in 1905.

He worked on a 1909 U.S. Mint assay and performed research at the Nela Laboratory in Cleveland in 1913. He is known for inventing the V-wedge method in 1911. In 1917, Mendenhall was made a Major of the Science and Research Division of the U.S. Army Signal Corps. He worked closely with his friend Robert Andrews Millikan at the Signal Corps. After World War I in 1919, he transferred to the U.S. Department of State, succeeding Henry A. Bumstead. He served for six months as the scientific attaché at the U.S. Embassy in London. He was chairman of the physical science division of the National Research Council in 1919 and 1920.

Later career
He became the department chair at the University of Wisconsin in 1926. In his time at the University of Wisconsin, he had 35 doctoral students, including Nobel Prize winner John Hasbrouck Van Vleck and Leland John Haworth. He remained professor until his death in 1935.

He was the vice president of The Optical Society in 1921 and the president of the American Physical Society from 1923 to 1925. He was the vice president of the American Association for the Advancement of Science in 1929.

Personal life
Mendenhall married Dorothy M. Reed of Talcottville, New York on February 14, 1906. They met as students at Johns Hopkins. Together, they had four children, including Margaret, who died shortly after birth, Thomas Corwin Mendenhall and John Talcott Mendenhall.

He played the violin and was active in musical circles for much of his life.

Death
Mendenhall died at a hospital in Madison, Wisconsin on August 18, 1935.

Awards and legacy
 In 1935, he was appointed fellow of the American Academy of Arts and Sciences.
 The Charles Elwood Mendenhall Fellowship is an award given to graduate students working in experimental physics at the University of Wisconsin–Madison.

References

1872 births
1935 deaths
People from Columbus, Ohio
Rose–Hulman Institute of Technology alumni
Johns Hopkins University alumni
United States Coast and Geodetic Survey personnel
20th-century American physicists
Optical physicists
University of Pennsylvania faculty
Williams College faculty
University of Wisconsin–Madison faculty
United States Army personnel of World War I
American Association for the Advancement of Science
Fellows of the American Academy of Arts and Sciences